Bund Garden is located 2 km from the Pune Railway Station. The gardens are situated next to Fitzgerald Bridge and take their name from the bund, or dam, on the Mula river.

History

These mini dams built by Jamsetjee Jejeebhoy, the Parsi businessman and philanthropist, served as a source of irrigation water for the under-privileged. The garden was opened in 1869 when the bridge was completed. It was planned by Colonel Sellon who was able to transform the waste space into a garden, known today as the "Mahatma Gandhi Udyan" a reference to the existing bridge that leads to the Gandhi National Memorial.

References

External links

 Bund Garden, Pune (Map of India site)

Parks in Pune